Daraghanlu (also Romanized as Darāghānlū and Dorāqānlū; also known as Shahrak-e Shahīd Eḩsānī) is a village in Badranlu Rural District, in the Central District of Bojnord County, North Khorasan Province, Iran. At the 2006 census, its population was 890, in 211 families.

References 

Populated places in Bojnord County